Sergey Yerkovich (born 9 March 1974) is a Belarusian ice hockey player. He competed in the men's tournament at the 1998 Winter Olympics.

Career statistics

Regular season and playoffs

International

References

External links
 

1974 births
Living people
Edmonton Oilers draft picks
Ice hockey players at the 1998 Winter Olympics
Olympic ice hockey players of Belarus
Ice hockey people from Minsk